Centre Musquodoboit is a forestry and farming community in the Musquodoboit Valley in the Halifax Regional Municipality of Nova Scotia.

Communications
The Telephone exchange is 902-889

Communities in Halifax, Nova Scotia